The Royal Marsden NHS Foundation Trust is an NHS Foundation Trust which operates the Royal Marsden Hospital facilities on two sites:
The Chelsea site in Brompton, next to the Royal Brompton Hospital, in Fulham Road 
The Sutton site in Belmont, close to Sutton Hospital, High Down and Downview Prisons

Private patients
The trust hopes to raise 45% of its income from private patients and other non-NHS sources in 2016/7 and is trying to raise its income from paying patients from £90m to £100m.  According to LaingBuisson it is the most commercially orientated NHS hospital.  It increased private patient income by 13% from 2014 to 2016 to £77 million.  In 2018-19 it made £121 million through its private patient units, more than a quarter of its total income, and about 18% of all the private healthcare carried out in England by the NHS.  This growth was led by imaging and robotic surgery. In 2019-20 50% of the trust’s total revenue, £463 million, came from NHS work.  9% came from Kuwait.  Payments from health insurance firms accounted for 16%, and self-pay patients for 2%.   The main commercial rival is Leaders in Oncology Care which in 2018 had income of  £95 million across its four sites.

Performance
In 1991 the Royal Marsden became the first NHS hospital to be awarded the Queen's Award for Technology for its work on drug development. The hospital achieved the international quality standard ISO 9001 for radiotherapy in 1996 and for chemotherapy in 2003. It was recognised as one of six centres of excellence in the Government's NHS Plan and has achieved four national Charter Marks for all its services, the most recent awarded in 2005. 
 
In April 2004 it became one of the first NHS Foundation Trusts.

It was named by the Health Service Journal as one of the top hundred NHS trusts to work for in 2015.  At that time it had 3528 full-time equivalent staff and a sickness absence rate of 2.85%. 89% of staff recommend it as a place for treatment and 71% recommended it as a place to work.

In March 2016 the trust was ranked third in the Learning from Mistakes League.

See also
 List of NHS trusts
 Cancer in the United Kingdom

References

External links

The Royal Marsden NHS Foundation Trust
Site summary information on The Royal Marsden (Sutton) on www.nhs.uk
Site summary information on The Royal Marsden (Fulham) on www.nhs.uk

NHS foundation trusts
Organizations established in 1851
Cancer organisations based in the United Kingdom
1851 establishments in England
Royal Marsden Hospital